Anton Patzner is a music composer, arranger and multi-instrumentalist. He is currently in the indie band Foxtails Brigade and duo group Laura & Anton.

Anton has also written articles for various music blogs and is a strong proponent for the use of the internet and its sharing powers to promote independent art.

Film scores
The Blue Aspic (2004)
Undercut (2004)
Rose (2005)
Big in Bollywood (2010)
Extraordinary: The Stan Romanek Story (2014)
Extraordinary: The Seeding (2019)

References

Living people
American rock violinists
American male violinists
Year of birth missing (living people)
21st-century American violinists
21st-century American male musicians